Tirodi is a census town in Balaghat district in the Indian state of Madhya Pradesh.

Geography
Tirodi has an average elevation of 375 metres (1,230 feet).

Demographics
 India census, Tirodi had a population of 8,847. Males constitute 49% of the population and females 51%. Tirodi has an average literacy rate of 65%, higher than the national average of 59.5%: male literacy is 75%, and female literacy is 56%. In Tirodi, 15% of the population is under 6 years of age.

Transport
The nearest airport is Jabalpur.

See also 
 Tirodi copper plates
Tirodi railway station

References

Cities and towns in Balaghat district